Cameron Rogers is an Australian writer of speculative fiction.

Biography
Rogers was born in 1972 in Cairns, Queensland, Australia. His first work to be published was a young adult novel, entitled The Vampires which he collaborated with Anthony Short who provided the illustrations. The Vampires is the twenty first book in the After Dark which was originally started in 1991 by Gary Crew. In 2001 Rogers released his novel The Music of Razors which was published by Penguin Books in Australia and by Del Rey Books in the United States. The Music of Razors was nominated for three awards at the 2001 Aurealis Awards – fantasy, horror, and young-adult categories however lost all three. In 2005 Rodgers released Nicholas and the Chronoporter as under the name Rowley Monkfish which is part of the Aussie Chomps series. and in 2007 The Music of Razors was released in the United States by Random House as an uncorrected proofs edition which featured an additional 40,000 words than the original release. Rogers currently works as the lead writer for Warframe.

Bibliography
The Vampires (1997, part of the After Dark series)
The Music of Razors (2001)
Nicholas and the Chronoporter (2005, as Rowley Monkfish, part of the Aussie Chomps series)

Source: ISFDB, cameron-rogers.com

Nominations
The Music of Razors
Nomination: 2001 Aurealis Award for best fantasy novel
Nomination: 2001 Aurealis Award for best horror novel
Nomination: 2001 Aurealis Award for best young-adult novel

References

External links
Official site

1972 births
Australian fantasy writers
Living people
Australian male novelists